Stanley Wolpert (December 23, 1927 – February 19, 2019) was an American historian,  Indologist, and author on the political and intellectual history of modern India and Pakistan and wrote fiction and nonfiction books on the topics. He taught at the University of California, Los Angeles (UCLA) from 1959 to 2002.

Biography

Early life
Stanley Albert Wolpert was born on December 23, 1927, in Brooklyn, New York to Russian Jewish parents. While serving as an engineer aboard a U.S. Merchant Marine ship, he arrived in Bombay, India for the first time on February 12, 1948. Upon arriving, he was both fascinated and overwhelmed by the extraordinary outpouring of grief over the death of Mahatma Gandhi—whom he then knew very little about—just two weeks earlier. Atop a hill, he witnessed numerous mourning Indians who were rushing to touch the ashes of Gandhi as the ship on which the urn was placed weighed anchor to scatter a portion of his ashes into the water below. On returning home, he abandoned his career in marine engineering for the study of Indian history. He received a B.A. from City College in 1953, and an M.A. and Ph.D. from the University of Pennsylvania in 1955 and 1959. with a dissertation (published as Tilak and Gokhale) on the revolutionary and reform wings of the Indian National Congress. The dissertation was one of the two books selected for the now discontinued biennial Watumull Prize of the American Historical Association in 1962, a prize recognizing "the best book on the history of India originally published in the United States."

Career
Wolpert began his academic career in 1959, when he took a job as an instructor in the Department of History at UCLA. He was promoted in 1960–63 to assistant professor; 1963-66 associate professor; 1967 full professor. In 1968 he was appointed department chair. He was later an emeritus professor.

Recognition
In 1975 Wolpert was awarded UCLA's Distinguished Teaching Award.

Wolpert was a guest on Connie Martinson Talks Books in 2011, promoting his 2010 book, India and Pakistan: Continued Conflict or Cooperation.

Personal life and death
He married Dorothy Wolpert (née Guberman) on June 12, 1953. They met in an American government class at City College of New York. She went on to become a senior partner in a Century City law firm, and made several visits to India with her husband. They had two sons and three grandchildren. His book Nine Hours to Rama was adapted to a feature film in 1963. Wolpert died on February 19, 2019.

Bibliography

Jinnah of Pakistan
Among Wolpert's famed works is Jinnah of Pakistan (1982), a biography compiled on Muhammad Ali Jinnah, the founding father of Pakistan. Wolpert described his subject as:

The book is regarded as one of the best biographical books on the life of Quaid-e-Azam Muhammad Ali Jinnah.

Congress and Indian Nationalism: The Pre-independence Phase
Wolpert served as editor alongside Richard Sisson of the volume of papers presented at the University of California, Los Angeles March 1984 international conference on the pre Independent phase of the Indian National Congress and published by the University of California Press.

Participating scholars in the conference include Dilip K. Basu, Judith M. Brown, Basudev Chatterji, Walter Huser, Stephen Northrup Hay, Eugene Irschick, Raghavan N. Iyer, D. A. Low, James Manor, Claude Markovits, John R. McLane, Thomas R. Metcalf, W. H. Morris Jones, V. A. Narain, Norman D. Palmer, Gyanendra Pandey, Bimal Prasad, Barbara N. Ramusack, Rajat Kanta Ray, Peter Reeves, Damodar Sardesai, Sumit Sarkar, Lawrence L. Shrader, William Vanderbok and Eleanor Zelliot.

Gandhi's Passion: The Life and the Legacy of Mahatma Gandhi

Published in 2001, Gandhi's Passion is a biography of Mahatma Gandhi. Wolpert describes the subject as:

"Mahatma Gandhi proved the strength of invisible soul-force. By so passionately embracing suffering all his mature life and fearlessly following his inner voice wherever it led him, Gandhi lived the message of Love and Truth he believed to be twin faces of God. His greatest luxury was to serve those who needed him: the sick, the hungry, people without work or pride or hope. He never gave up his quest to liberate India from imperial bonds of exploitation and to liberate humankind from the shackles of prejudice, fear, and hatred, and from the terrors of brutal racial and religious, class and caste conflict. He courted pain as most men did pleasure, welcomed sorrow as others greeted joy, and was always ready to face any opponent or his own death with a disarming smile of love. He lived to the full his mantra, “Do or die!” Still, he failed to convert most of modern India to his faith in the ancient yogic powers of Tapas and Ahimsa as superior to the atom bomb. He was not, of course, the first or only prophet of peace murdered by a self-righteous killer, nor, most unfortunately, would he be the last. But he was the greatest Indian since the fifth-century B.C. “Enlightened One,” the Buddha."

Delhi University historian Shahid Amin in his review for the Outlook, called it an "empathetic and meticulous biography". He observed, "Wolpert's attempt is to demonstrate through a close reading of Gandhi's own voluminous writings the unique combination of yogic tapas and Christian passion (the suffering of Jesus Christ on the cross") that the Mahatma embodied in his body-polity." The biography was severely criticised by columnist Swapan Dasgupta, who wrote in India Today, "Wolpert's biography is not the work of a professional historian.... it is essentially a sympathetic assessment, a study of Gandhi the saint that only tangentially — and with some glaring factual inaccuracies (like describing the Jallianwala Bagh meeting in Amritsar as a gathering of peasants 'celebrating their spring harvest') and sweeping over-generalisations takes into account the environment he operated in."

Pankaj Mishra, in his review for The New York Times, described it as a "somewhat perfunctory biography". He wrote, "the best that can be said about Wolpert's book is that while it tells you nothing about Gandhi that hasn't been said before, it doesn't oversimplify its subject." Further adding, "Wolpert mentions Martin Luther King Jr. and Nelson Mandela as having drawn inspiration from Gandhi's methods. Disappointingly, he doesn't go into the manifold ways Gandhi's distrust of modernity has found echoes among many political and environmental movements around the world." 

Ahmed Abbas in his review for ISSI, called the book "a valuable addition to the literature on the contemporary history of the Indian subcontinent". Diplomat and author, Shashi Tharoor in his review for The Washington Post called it " a smooth, highly readable but flawed book." He added, "Wolpert's narrative is rather bloodless; the characters on its pages are largely just names, with little physical description, social background or political context provided. Two skimpy chapters on Gandhi's legacy are all that justify the book's subtitle.... the book is riddled with minor errors unworthy of a historian of Wolpert's eminence, ranging from the description of Ahmedabad in 1887 as the capital of Gujarat, a state that did not come into existence till the 1950s, to placing the British Viceroy in 1925 in Calcutta, though British India had moved its capital to Delhi in 1911.... Wolpert gives us the saint, but the shrewd politician is little in evidence in this book. And yet Wolpert gets all the essentials right, and he does so in lucid and lively prose."

Shameful Flight: The Last Years of the British Empire in India
Published in 2006, Shameful Flight is a chronological study of the last days of the British Empire in India from the fall of Singapore in 1942 to the Jammu and Kashmir war of 1947–48.

Columnist Swapan Dasgupta in his review for The Times Of India criticised Wolpert's 'central argument' for mirroring 'the misgivings of the relics of the pre-War Conservative Party to the management of decolonization.' Yet, he refused to lump him with the Tory "revisionist" historians such as Andrew Roberts and Niall Ferguson and called his central thesis 'intriguing'. He observed, 'The problem is that Wolpert's own narrative doesn't justify singling out Mountbatten for all the opprobrium'. Furthermore, 'On Wolpert's suggestion that a united, independent Bengal would have prevented the tragedy in the east ignores cruel ground realities'.

Publications

Non-fiction
Tilak and Gokhale : Revolution and Reform in the Making of Modern India (1962)
Morley and India, 1906-1910 (1967)
A New History of India (1977, 1982, 1989, 1993, 1997, 2000, 2004, 2008)
Roots of Confrontation in South Asia : Afghanistan, Pakistan, India and the Superpowers (1982)
Jinnah of Pakistan (1984)
Congress and Indian Nationalism : The Pre-Independence Phase (co-edited with Richard Sisson) (1988)
India (1991)
Zulfi Bhutto of Pakistan: His Life and Times (1993)
Nehru : A Tryst With Destiny (1996)
Gandhi's Passion : The Life and the Legacy of Mahatma Gandhi (2001)
Encyclopedia of India (editor) (2005)
Shameful Flight:The Last Years of British Empire in India (2006)
India and Pakistan: Continued Conflict or Cooperation (2010)

Fiction
Aboard the Flying Swan (1954)
Nine Hours to Rama (1962)
The Expedition: A Novel (1967)
An Error of Judgment (1970)

References

External links

1927 births
American Indologists
American people of Russian-Jewish descent
City College of New York alumni
Historians of India
Historians of Pakistan
Historians of South Asia
2019 deaths
Writers from Brooklyn
University of Pennsylvania alumni
University of California, Los Angeles faculty